M/V Chenega is a catamaran ferry built by Derecktor Shipyards in Bridgeport, Connecticut for the Alaska Marine Highway System entering service 2005. After being laid up in 2017, in March 2021 it was sold by the Alaska Department of Transportation & Public Facilities to Servicios y Concesiones Maritimas Ibicencas along with sister ship MV Fairweather for service between Spain and Ibiza.

Route
The Chenega ran into controversy from virtually the day it came into service. The Chenega had long been promised to service Prince William Sound year-round, and starting in the summer of 2005, however it came into service later than scheduled and the state of Alaska soon reneged on its promise for full-time Prince William Sound service and transferred the Chenega to its current route between Ketchikan and Petersburg with occasional stops in Wrangell for the winter.

The new plan was to have the Chenega run this Southeast Alaska route in the winter and then transfer the ferry up to Prince William Sound in the summer. This was especially controversial because unlike feeder and mainline ferry vessels, the fast ferries only operated in the day thus their crews lived in their homeports offering additional economic stimulus to its host community. Because of this, Cordova, the Chenega's Prince William Sound home, was especially outraged after the decision to transfer the boat to Ketchikan. In the winter, the MV Aurora took the Chenega's place running the Prince William Sound route.

References

External links

Alaska Marine Highway System vessels
Ferries of Spain
2005 ships
Ships built in Bridgeport, Connecticut